Burned Out may refer to:

"Burned Out", song from Sevendust album Seasons
"Burned Out", song from Blues Pills album Lady in Gold
Burnt Out, a 2005 French film starring Olivier Gourmet
"Burned Out", a song by Dodie Clark from Human

See also
 Burnout (disambiguation)